Mireille Nguimgo (born 7 November 1976) is a Cameroonian sprinter who specialized in the 400 metres.

She has not competed on top level since the 2004 season.

Achievements

Personal bests
200 metres - 23.64 s (2000)
400 metres - 50.69 s (2000) - national record

She also holds the national record in 4×400 metres relay with 3:27.08 minutes, achieved together with teammates Carole Kaboud Mebam, Delphine Atangana and Hortense Béwouda in August 2003 in Paris.

References
 

1976 births
Living people
Cameroonian female sprinters
Athletes (track and field) at the 2000 Summer Olympics
Athletes (track and field) at the 2004 Summer Olympics
Olympic athletes of Cameroon
Athletes (track and field) at the 1998 Commonwealth Games
Athletes (track and field) at the 2002 Commonwealth Games
Commonwealth Games competitors for Cameroon
African Games bronze medalists for Cameroon
African Games medalists in athletics (track and field)
Athletes (track and field) at the 2003 All-Africa Games
Olympic female sprinters
21st-century Cameroonian women